German submarine U-994 was a Type VIIC U-boat of Nazi Germany's Kriegsmarine during World War II.

She was ordered on 25 May 1941, and was laid down on 14 November 1942 at Blohm & Voss, Hamburg, as yard number 194. She was launched on 8 July 1943 and commissioned under the command of Leutnant zur See Wolf Ackermann on 2 September 1943.

Design
German Type VIIC submarines were preceded by the shorter Type VIIB submarines. U-994 had a displacement of  when at the surface and  while submerged. She had two shafts and two  propellers.

U-994 was fitted with five  torpedo tubes (four fitted at the bow and one at the stern), fourteen torpedoes or 26 TMA mines, one  SK C/35 naval gun, 220 rounds, and one twin  C/30 anti-aircraft gun. The boat had a complement of between 44 — 52 men.

Service history
On 17 July 1944, as U-944 was returning from her first, and only, war patrol she came under attack by a Norwegian Mosquito of No. 333 (Norwegian) Squadron RAF/L. Five crewmen were wounded and the boat sustained some damage and reached Bergen later that same day.

On 9 May 1945, U-994 surrendered at Trondheim, Norway. She was later transferred to Loch Ryan, Scotland on 29 May 1945. Of the 156 U-boats that eventually surrendered to the Allied forces at the end of the war, U-994 was one of 116 selected to take part in Operation Deadlight. U-994 was towed out on 5 December 1945, but foundered while under tow making her one of 55 other U-boats that sank before reaching the scuttling area.

References

External links

Bibliography

German Type VIIC submarines
U-boats commissioned in 1943
World War II submarines of Germany
Ships built in Hamburg
1943 ships
Maritime incidents in December 1945
World War II shipwrecks in the Atlantic Ocean
Operation Deadlight